Paul Robert Doyle (born April 30, 1963) is an American politician serving as a Democratic state senator from Connecticut since 2007. A resident of Wethersfield, Doyle represents the southern suburbs of Hartford in the Connecticut Senate, including the towns of Cromwell, Middletown, Newington, Rocky Hill, and Wethersfield.

Personal life 
Doyle was born in Hartford and received a B.A. in History from Colby College and his Juris Doctor from the University of Connecticut. Prior to being elected in the Connecticut Senate, Doyle served on the Wethersfield Town Council and as a Connecticut State Representative. In 2006, he ran for the Connecticut Senate for the first time and won.

Political career 
Doyle often votes independently of his party.  He was one of three Democrats to support Governor M. Jodi Rell's plan for a Three Strikes Law against career violent criminals.  He was one of two Democrats to oppose the 2011 transgender rights bill, and was the only Democrat to vote against the New Britain–Hartford Busway.

See also
Connecticut Senate

References

External links
Official Senate website

1963 births
Living people
Colby College alumni
Democratic Party Connecticut state senators
Democratic Party members of the Connecticut House of Representatives
Politicians from Hartford, Connecticut
University of Connecticut School of Law alumni
21st-century American politicians
People from Wethersfield, Connecticut
20th-century American politicians